Janovice nad Úhlavou is a town in Klatovy District in the Plzeň Region of the Czech Republic. It has about 2,300 inhabitants.

Administrative parts
Villages of Dolní Lhota, Dubová Lhota, Hvízdalka, Ondřejovice, Petrovice nad Úhlavou, Plešiny, Rohozno, Spůle, Vacovy and Veselí are administrative parts of Janovice nad Úhlavou.

Geography
It lies mostly in the Švihov Highlands, but the municipal territory extends also to the Bohemian Forest Foothills in the south and west. The town is situated at the confluence of the Úhlava River and Jelenka Stream. Podstránský Pond is located in the northern part of the territory.

History
The first written mention of Janovice nad Úhlavou is from 1290. In the second half of the 14th century, the settlement became a town.

Sights
The most valuable building is the Church of Saint John the Baptist. It is an early Gothic building from around 1260. In 1764, it was baroque modified and the tower was added.

There is a Jewish cemetery from the early 18th century.

Notable people
Karel Pacner (1936–2021), journalist and writer

Gallery

References

External links

Cities and towns in the Czech Republic
Populated places in Klatovy District